Itihaas is a 1997 Indian Hindi language romantic action thriller film produced and directed by Raj Kanwar. The film stars Ajay Devgn and Twinkle Khanna as the lead protagonists, and Raj Babbar as the antagonist. Amrish Puri, Shakti Kapoor and Mohnish Bahl played supporting roles in the film. The film opened to negative reviews and failed to do well at the box office.

Plot
Wealthy, powerful, and influential Thakur Digvijay Singh (Raj Babbar) visits a village and falls in love with beautiful Naina (Twinkle Khanna). They are betrothed and are to be married soon. But Naina has fallen in love with the son, Karan (Ajay Devgn), of Thakur's employee, Balwant (Amrish Puri). When Thakur finds out about this, he instructs his men to bring in Naina alive, and Karan dead. Karan and Naina run from this community all the way to Bombay. The Thakur announces a hefty reward, and soon bounty hunters are all over Bombay looking for the hapless couple. When Balwant hears about this, he too goes to Bombay and does locate Karan and Naina. Karan is relieved to see his dad, but his relief soon turns to disbelief, as Balwant instructs him to let go of Naina, as he himself has come as an agent of the Thakur, not as his father.

Cast
Ajay Devgan as Karan Bakshi
Twinkle Khanna as Naina Singh
Mohnish Behl as Inspector Ujagar Pandey
Amrish Puri as Balwant
Raj Babbar as Thakur Digvijay Singh
Shakti Kapoor as Navlakhi / Dholu
Sapna Bedi as Anjali Sharma
Aruna Irani as Rukmani
Neelima Azim as Naveli

Production
Itihaas was the first attempt of Kanwar at producing a film and was highly publicised. He repeated the pairing of Devgn and Khanna who had previously starred in his 1996 film Jaan. Outlook noted that the film had been "lavishly produced". Xavier Marquis also helped in the film's finances.

Soundtrack
Lyrics by Sameer Anjaan, Music by Dilip Sen-Sameer Sen. 

The audio cassette of the film was released at the Sun & Sand Hotel in Juhu.

Reception
Reportedly made on the successful pairing of Devgn and Khanna in Jaan, Rediff.com rated it #8 in its Ten Worst Films of Ajay Devgn list while calling it a "dreadful action romance".

Supran Verma of Rediff.com wrote that the film had "turned to be just a rehash of [Jaan] and other Kanwar films" and Khanna and Devgn's pairing was the "film's biggest fault". A review in India Today called the film a "clichéd story" and "painfully regressive" "by Bollywood standards" before labelling it a "torturous experience".

The film performed poorly at the box office, becoming the first flop of Raj Kanwar. Devgn took the Bombay territory as fees.

References

Further reading

External links
 

1990s Hindi-language films
1997 films
Films scored by Dilip Sen-Sameer Sen
Indian action drama films
Films with screenplays by Robin Bhatt
Films with screenplays by Akash Khurana
Films directed by Raj Kanwar
1990s action drama films